The Dickson County War Memorial Building is a historic building in Dickson, Tennessee, U.S.. It was built in 1932–1933. It was designed in the Colonial Revival architectural style by Emmons H. Woolwine. It was home to the Dickson County Library from 1933 to 1939, when it was used for the Draft board. It has been listed on the National Register of Historic Places since March 18, 1999.

References

Buildings and structures on the National Register of Historic Places in Tennessee
Colonial Revival architecture in Tennessee
Buildings and structures completed in 1933
Buildings and structures in Dickson County, Tennessee